Bogen is a surname. Notable people with the surname include:

Albert Bogen (1882–1961), Austrian fencer
Alexander Bogen (1916–2010), Polish-Israeli artist
Bjarne Bogen (born 1951), Norwegian immunologist
Boris D. Bogen (1869–1929), Russian-American educator and social worker
Debra Bogen, American pediatrician and public health official
James Bogen, American science philosopher
Joel Bogen, English guitarist
Joseph Bogen, American neurophysiologist
Nancy Bogen, American scholar, author, and artist
Øystein Bogen (born 1969), Norgwegian journalist and documentary filmmaker
Paul Logasa Bogen, United States Army officer

See also
Erna Bogen-Bogáti, Hungarian fencer
Bogan (surname)